Konrad R. Fiałkowski (29 December 1939 — 23 November 2020) was a Polish engineer, information technology scientist and hard science fiction writer.

Life
Born in Lublin, Fiałkowski held the titles of Professor at American Rensselaer Polytechnic Institute and Warsaw University.

Scientific work

In 1966 he was part of the team which designed the minicomputer series  for biomedical apptilcations.

Books

Scientific books 
 K. Fiałkowski, „”, Wyd. PWN, Warszawa 2008, 
 „Wprowadzenie do Informatyki”, 1978, Państwowe Wydawnictwa Naukowe, Warszawa (współautor J. Bańkowski). 3 wydania.
 „Programowanie w języku FORTRAN dla ODRA 1300, ICL 1900, CDC CYBER 70”, 1978 Państwowe Wydawnictwa Naukowe, Warszawa (współautorzy J. Bańkowski i Z. Odrowąż-Sypniewski).
 „Programowanie w języku FORTRAN” 1972, Państwowe Wydawnictwa Naukowe, Warszawa (współautor J. Bańkowski). 4 wydania.
 „Autokody i programowanie maszyn cyfrowych”, 1963, Wydawnictwa Naukowo Techniczne, Warszawa. 3 wydania
 „Maszyna ZAM-2”, 1963, Wydawnictwa Naukowo Techniczne, Warszawa.

Novels 
 Homo divisus (1979)
 Adam, jeden z nas (1986)

Short story collections
 Wróble Galaktyki (1963)
 Poprzez piąty wymiar (1967)
 Włókno Claperiusa (1969)
 Kosmodrom (1975)
 Kosmodrom 2 (1976)
 Witalizacja kosmogatora (1978)
 Cerebroskop (1978)
 Kosmodrom (1982)
 Biohazard (1990)
 Star City. Opowieści z Marsa (2007) (with Rafał Kosik)
 Nieśmiertelny z Wegi (2014)
 Zerowe rozwiązanie (2014)

Adaptations
Some author's short stories were adapted for film and TV: Kopia (2018, short film),  based on short story Telefon Wigilijny ("Christmas Phone");  Biohazard (1977, TV film, 1975, TV show) based on short story Biohazard; Porprzez piaty wymiar ("Through the Fifth Dimension") (1973, TV film) based on the story of the same name.

References

External links

1939 births
2020 deaths
Scientists from Lublin
Polish science fiction writers
Polish computer scientists
Rensselaer Polytechnic Institute faculty
Academic staff of the University of Warsaw
Polish fantasy writers
Writers from Lublin